Cyclocrinitids are an early (mid-Ordovician–early-Silurian) Dasycladalean algae, resembling but probably not closely related to the Receptaculitids.

References

Dasycladales